Korean Socialist Party was a communist party of Korea. The party was founded in 1918 in Khabarovsk, Soviet Russia. In April, 1919, the party merged with the Daehan sinmindan at the second representative congress of Korean Socialist Party. And in 1921, the party merged with Korean communist groups of Irkutsk and was renamed as the Koryo Communist Party.

The establishment of the party was supported by the local Bolshevik authority in the Russian Far East, represented by the likes of Alexander Krasnoshchyokov and Alexandra Kim.

References

1918 establishments in Russia
1921 disestablishments in Russia
Communist parties in Korea
Defunct political parties in Korea
Korean independence movement
Korean expatriates in the Soviet Union
Khabarovsk